Laughlin P. Farris (December 23, 1843 – December 9, 1925) was a farmer and political figure in New Brunswick, Canada. He represented Queen's County in the Legislative Assembly of New Brunswick from 1892 to 1908 as a Liberal member. His first name also appears as Laughlan or Lauchlan in some sources.

He was born in Whites Cove, New Brunswick, the son of John Farris and Sarah McLean, and educated in Fredericton. Farris married Louise Hay. He served on the province's Executive Council as a minister without portfolio and then as Commissioner for Agriculture.

His son John Wallace de Beque Farris served in the Legislative Assembly of British Columbia and the Canadian Senate.

References

Sources 
 Canadian Parliamentary Guide, 1908, EJ Chambers

1843 births
1925 deaths
Canadian farmers
Canadian Baptists
New Brunswick Liberal Association MLAs
People from Queens County, New Brunswick
19th-century Baptists